Knyazevo may refer to the following places in Russia:

 Knyazevo, Arkhangelsky District, Republic of Bashkortostan
 Knyazevo, Ufa, Republic of Bashkortostan
 Knyazevo, Vologodsky District, Vologda Oblast
 Knyazevo, Gryazovetsky District, Vologda Oblast
 Knyazevo, Voronezh Oblast

See also 
 Knyazhevo (disambiguation)